This is a list of airlines currently operating in Mauritania:

See also
 List of defunct airlines of Mauritania
 List of airports in Mauritania
 List of companies based in Mauritania

Mauritania
Airlines
Airlines
Mauritania